Frister is a surname. Notable people with the surname include:

Roman Frister (1928–2015), Polish writer
Karla Frister, German rower